Reynolds House is a historic home located at Asheville, Buncombe County, North Carolina. It was built about 1855, and renovated in 1905 in the Colonial Revival style. It consists of a two-story double pile plan brick core structure with a third floor within a dormered mansard roof.  It features a wraparound porch.

It was listed on the National Register of Historic Places in 1984.

References

Houses on the National Register of Historic Places in North Carolina
Colonial Revival architecture in North Carolina
Houses completed in 1855
Houses in Asheville, North Carolina
National Register of Historic Places in Buncombe County, North Carolina